Cookin' with the Miles Davis Quintet is an album recorded in 1956 by the Miles Davis Quintet in Rudy Van Gelder's studio in Hackensack, New Jersey, and released in July 1957. As the musicians had to pay for the studio time (a result of a rather modest contract with Prestige), their recordings are practically live. Two sessions on 11 May and 26 October 1956 resulted in four albums — this one, Relaxin' with the Miles Davis Quintet, Steamin' with the Miles Davis Quintet and Workin' with the Miles Davis Quintet.

It was the first of the four LPs to be released. In response to the album title, Davis said, "After all, that's what we did—came in and cooked."

The album was originally released in the US in 1957 and it was remastered for CD by Van Gelder in 2006 for Prestige Records.

Reid Miles designed the album's cover and Phil Hays provided the illustration.

Reception

In a review for AllMusic, Lindsay Planer wrote: "As these recordings demonstrate, there is an undeniable telepathic cohesion that allows this band... to work so efficiently both on the stage and the studio... The immediate yet somewhat understated ability of each musician to react with ingenuity and precision is expressed in the consistency and singularity of each solo as it is maintained from one musician to the next without the slightest deviation."

Chris May of All About Jazz commented: "Cookin''' may not have had the big budget and glossy marketing CBS brought to Davis' subsequent releases, but... it contains some of the most alive and moving music he ever recorded... His lyricism remains dark and brooding, but it's so rich it sings."

Writing for The Music Box'', John Metzger called the album "essential," stating that it "precisely showcased the ensemble's full range and potential," and praising the "absolutely extraordinary" communication amongst the musicians.

Track listing
Prestige – LP 7094:

Personnel
 Miles Davis – trumpet, bandleader
 Paul Chambers – double bass
 John Coltrane – tenor saxophone  (except 1)
 Red Garland – piano
 Philly Joe Jones – drums

References

1957 albums
Miles Davis albums
Prestige Records albums
Albums produced by Bob Weinstock
Albums recorded at Van Gelder Studio
Albums with cover art by Reid Miles